Alvy Ray Smith III (born September 8, 1943) is an American computer scientist who co-founded Lucasfilm's Computer Division and Pixar, participating in the 1980s and 1990s expansion of computer animation into feature film.

Education 
In 1965, Alvy Smith received his bachelor's degree in electrical engineering  from New Mexico State University (NMSU). He created his first computer graphic in 1965 at NMSU. In 1970, he received a Ph.D. in computer science from Stanford University, with a dissertation on cellular automata theory jointly supervised by Michael A. Arbib, Edward J. McCluskey, and Bernard Widrow.

Career 
His first art show was at the Stanford Coffeehouse. From 1969 to 1973 he was an associate professor of Electrical Engineering and Computer Science at New York University, under chairman Herbert Freeman, one of the earliest computer graphics researchers. He taught briefly at the University of California, Berkeley in 1974.

While at Xerox PARC in 1974, Smith worked with Richard Shoup on SuperPaint, one of the first computer raster graphics editor, or 'paint', programs. Smith's major contribution to this software was the creation of the HSV color space, also known as HSB. He created his first computer animations on the SuperPaint system.

In 1975, Smith joined the new Computer Graphics Laboratory at New York Institute of Technology (NYIT), where he was given the job title "Information Quanta". There, working alongside a traditional cel animation studio, he met Ed Catmull and several core personnel of Pixar. Smith worked on a series of newer paint programs, including Paint3, the first true-color raster graphics editor. As part of this work, he co-invented the concept of the alpha channel. He was also the programmer and collaborator on Ed Emshwiller's animation Sunstone, included in the collection of the Museum of Modern Art in New York. Smith worked at NYIT until 1979, and then briefly at the Jet Propulsion Laboratory with Jim Blinn on the Carl Sagan Cosmos: A Personal Voyage television series.

With Ed Catmull, Smith was a founding member of the Lucasfilm Computer Division, which developed computer graphics software, including early renderer technology. As director of the Computer Graphics Project, Smith created and directed the "Genesis Demo" in Star Trek II: The Wrath of Khan, and conceived and directed the short animated film The Adventures of André & Wally B., animated by John Lasseter. At some point in the 1980s, a designer suggested naming a new digital compositing computer the "Picture Maker". Smith thought that the laser-based device have a catchier name, and came up with "Pixer", which after a meeting was changed to "Pixar".

Smith and Catmull co-founded Pixar in 1986 with financing from Steve Jobs. After the spinout from Lucasfilm of Pixar, he served on the board of directors and was executive vice president. According to the Steve Jobs biography iCon by Jeffrey S. Young and William L. Simon, Alvy Ray quit Pixar after a heated argument with Jobs over the use of a whiteboard. It was an unwritten rule that no one other than Jobs was allowed to use it, a rule Smith decided to break in front of everyone after Jobs went "total street bully" on him and they ended up screaming into each other's face "in full bull rage". Despite being the co-founder of Pixar, Young and Simon claim that the company has largely overlooked his part in company history since his departure. For example, there is no mention of Smith on the Pixar website.

He was for four years (1988–1992) a member of the board of regents of the National Library of Medicine in Bethesda, Maryland, where he was instrumental in inaugurating the Visible Human Project.

In 1991, Smith left Pixar to cofound Altamira Software, with Eric Lyons and Nicholas Clay. Altamira was acquired by Microsoft in 1994. Smith became the first Graphics Fellow at Microsoft in 1994. Pixar would go on to release Toy Story the following year and go public, helping to put Steve Jobs back at Apple.

Smith retired from Microsoft in 1999, to spend his time giving talks, making digital photographs, doing scholarly genealogy, and researching technical history. He lives in Seattle, Washington. In 2010 Smith married Alison Gopnik, author and Professor of Psychology at the University of California, Berkeley.

Awards
With his collaborators, Smith has twice been recognized by the Academy of Motion Picture Arts and Sciences for his scientific and engineering contributions, to digital image compositing (1996 award) and digital paint systems (1998 award).

In 1990, Smith and Richard Shoup received the ACM SIGGRAPH Computer Graphics Achievement Award for their development of paint programs. Smith presented the Forsythe Lecture in 1997 at Stanford University, where he received his PhD in 1970. His undergraduate alma mater New Mexico State University awarded him an honorary doctorate in December 1999. He was inducted into the CRN Industry Hall of Fame at the Computer History Museum in Mountain View, CA in 2004. In 2006, Smith was elected a member of the National Academy of Engineering. In 2010, Smith was elected a Fellow of the American Society of Genealogists and presented the Washington Award in Chicago for advancing "the welfare of humankind". In 2011, Smith was awarded the Special Award at Mundos Digitales in La Coruna, Spain, for lifetime achievement in computer graphics. In 2012, Smith was awarded the Digital Media Symposium Lifetime Achievement Award in Boulder, Colorado, and was awarded a plaque in the Circle of Honor at New Mexico State University. In 2013, Smith was elected a fellow of the American Association for the Advancement of Science. Smith has been the recipient of several grants from the National Science Foundation and the National Endowment for the Arts during his career. In May 2022, Smith received an honorary Doctor of Science degree from New York Institute of Technology (where he co-founded the Computer Graphics Laboratory) for his pioneering work in computer animation.

See also 
 HWB color model

References

Sources
 Michael Rubin, Droidmaker: George Lucas and the Digital Revolution (2005) 
 Elio Quiroga, "La Materia de los Sueños", Fundación DMR Consulting, Ediciones Deusto (Spain, 2004) 
 Simon, William L. and Young, Jeffrey S. "iCon: The Greatest Second Act in the History of Business." (2005) 
 David A. Price, "The Pixar Touch: The Making of a Company" (2008) 
 Walter Isaacson, "Steve Jobs" (2011)

External links 

 Alvy Ray Smith's web site
 
 
 Interviewed by Alan Macfarlane 20th June 2017 (video)
 

1943 births
Living people
American experimental filmmakers
American genealogists
Computer graphics professionals
Computer graphics researchers
Cellular automatists
New Mexico State University alumni
Stanford University alumni
New York University faculty
Place of birth missing (living people)
Members of the United States National Academy of Engineering
Fellows of the American Association for the Advancement of Science
Pixar people
New York Institute of Technology faculty
Fellows of the American Society of Genealogists
Scientists at PARC (company)
Lucasfilm people
Pixar
Academy Award for Technical Achievement winners
People from Clovis, New Mexico